Softie is a 2020 Kenyan film, based on the life of political activist and photojournalist Boniface Mwangi and his family. The film, directed by Sam Soko first premiered internationally at the 2020 Sundance Film Festival where it won a special jury prize for editing. Softie, which is set to premier in Kenya on October 16, 2020, also won the Best Documentary at the Durban International Film Festival (DIFF) 2020. An award that has qualified the film for consideration for the Oscar documentary shortlist for the 93rd Academy Awards ceremony.

Film festivals 
The film has been screened at international film festivals including the Copenhagen International Documentary Festival, Full Frame Documentary Film Festival and at the Encounters Festival South Africa where it won Best Film. Softie was also the opening film at the Hotdocs Film Festival and at the Human Rights Festival held in Berlin.

Plot 
The film tells the story of the protagonist Boniface Mwangi, nicknamed "Softie", Kenyan slang for "wimp", in his childhood years but who has ironically turned out as one of most daring and audacious activists in Kenya at the forefront of fighting injustices in the country. His activism and the constant danger the path he has chosen poses to his life and that of his family creates a tremendous turmoil between him and his wife Njeri Mwangi, who is protective of her family.

The film chronicles the activist's seven-year journey beginning with chaos-filled street protests and culminating in Boniface's decision to run for a political seat in his childhood neighbourhood, Starehe constituency, where he is confronted by the reality of challenging strong political dynasties.

Awards 

 World Cinema Documentary Special Jury Award for Editing - Sundance Film Festival 2020
 Best Film - The 22nd Encounters South African International Documentary
 Best Documentary - Durban International Film Festival (DIFF) 2020

Production 
The production of Softie started in 2013 after an encounter between the film's director and producer Sam Soko and Boniface Mwangi. Soko, who had only directed several short music videos and films by that time, decided to try his hand at directing a documentary. The initial plan was to shoot a short video, that would only take an year to film but eventually the story evolved into a major story about politics, family and what it means to be a Kenyan citizen passionate about change.

The film is Soko's first feature documentary.

References 

2020 films
Kenyan drama films